The Opel Corsa Rally4 is a rally car developed and built by Opel for the Rally Pyramid regulation of the Rally4 category. It is based upon the Opel Corsa road car and is the successor of Opel Adam R2.

Rally victories

Regional championships

European Rally Championship-4

References

External links

 Opel Corsa Rally4 at eWRC-results.com

Corsa Rally4
Rally4 cars